Roldana also known as groundsel is a genus of large herbs or subshrubs from the tribe groundsel tribe within the sunflower family.

Most if not all of its members used to be members of a related genus, Senecio.  The species which are native to Southwest United States, Mexico and Central America and naturalized elsewhere.

 Species

 formerly included
several species now regarded as better suited to other genera: Senecio Trixis

References

External links

Senecioneae
Asteraceae genera
Flora of North America